Gayle Rankin is a Scottish actress, best known as Sheila the She-Wolf in the TV series GLOW.
She also played the role of Queen Victoria in The Greatest Showman and Emily Dodson in HBO's Perry Mason.

Early life
Rankin trained at the Juilliard School in New York City, the first Scot to win a place there.

Career
In 2012, Rankin made her acting debut in Law & Order: Special Victims Unit. In 2017, Rankin began appearing on Glow, as Sheila the She-Wolf. It premiered on 23 June 2017, on Netflix. The show was renewed for a third season which premiered on 9 August 2019.

In 2017, Rankin appeared in The Meyerowitz Stories, directed by Noah Baumbach. The film premiered at the Cannes Film Festival, and was released by Netflix on 13 October 2017. That same year, she appeared in The Greatest Showman opposite Hugh Jackman and Michelle Williams.

In 2018, Rankin appeared in Irreplaceable You, directed by Stephanie Laing, opposite Gugu Mbatha-Raw and Michiel Huisman. It was released by Netflix on 16 February 2018. That same year, she appeared in In a Relationship directed by Sam Boyd, which had its world premiere at the Tribeca Film Festival on 20 April 2018, and in Her Smell, directed by Alex Ross Perry, opposite Elisabeth Moss and Agyness Deyn.

In 2020, she was cast as Emily Dodson, the mother of Charlie Dodson, a 1-year-old child who is mysteriously kidnapped in Perry Mason.

Film

Television

Theater

References

External links

Living people
Scottish film actresses
Scottish musical theatre actresses
Scottish stage actresses
Scottish television actresses
Juilliard School alumni
Year of birth missing (living people)
21st-century Scottish actresses